Inácio Carneiro dos Santos, known as Inácio (born 29 January 1996) is a Brazilian football player who plays as a left back.

Club career
He made his professional debut in the Segunda Liga for Porto B on 21 September 2016 in a game against Sporting Covilhã.

He made his debut for the main squad of Porto on 29 November 2016 in a 2016–17 Taça da Liga game against Belenenses.

On 8 January 2019, Guarani FC announced that they had signed Inácio on a season-long loan deal.

References

External links

1996 births
Sportspeople from Bahia
Living people
Brazilian footballers
Brazilian expatriate footballers
Primeira Liga players
Liga Portugal 2 players
Campeonato Brasileiro Série B players
FC Porto B players
FC Porto players
Portimonense S.C. players
Guarani FC players
F.C. Penafiel players
Association football defenders
Brazilian expatriate sportspeople in Portugal
Expatriate footballers in Portugal